, also known as "Dan Dan Dubi Zuba!", is the 13th single by Japanese co-ed group Dream5. Released on October 29, 2014, the song was a collaboration with the fictional character Sergeant Burly and was used as the second ending theme to the 2014 Yo-kai Watch TV-series, replacing "Yo-kai Exercise No. 1".

"Don-Don-Dooby-Zoo-Bah!" had a positive commercial response, peaking at number one on the weekly Oricon Singles Chart and being certified gold by the Recording Industry Association of Japan (RIAJ), indicating over 100 thousand sales.

Background and release 
Dream5 first began working on the Yo-kai Watch series with "Yo-kai Exercise No. 1", which was the group's 12th single. Dream5's next single for the franchise ended up being "Don-Don-Dooby-Zoo-Bah!", which was intended to follow-up "Yo-kai Exercise No. 1". The song's dances was choreographed by Lucky Ikeda, who had choreographed the dances for multiple other Yo-kai Watch songs, most notably "Gera Gera Po".

"Don-Don-Dooby-Zoo-Bah!" first appeared as the credits theme to both versions of Yo-kai Watch 2 in Japan, released July 10, 2014. A day later, the song debuted in the Yo-kai Watch anime series as the new ending theme, replacing "Yo-kai Exercise No. 1". The song was released as a CD later on October 29, under the FRAME label. To promote the release of the CD, Dream5 and people in costumes of Yo-kai Watch characters performed the song live at the Ario Nishiarai shopping center. In December later the same year, "Don-Don-Dooby-Zoo-Bah!" was used as the ending theme to Yo-kai Watch: The Movie.

In 2015, "Don-Don-Dooby-Zoo-Bah!" was included in the rhythm game Yo-kai Watch Dance: Just Dance Special Version, as one of the game's 10 songs.

Commercial performance 
"Don-Don-Dooby-Zoo-Bah!" had a positive release in Japan, selling over 60 thousand units in its first week of release. A few days later, the song was ceritified gold by the Recording Industry Association of Japan, indicating over 100 thousand sales. The song debuted at first place on the weekly Oricon Singles Chart for the week of November 10, 2014. The same week, the song debuted on the Billboard Japan Hot 100 chart at number 3. In total, the song made twenty-five appearances on the Oricon Singles Chart and four appearances on the Billboard Japan Hot 100 chart.

Personnel 
Credits adapted from the CD release of "Don-Don-Dooby-Zoo-Bah!" and Twitter.

 Takashi Takagi – producer
 Tatsuo Higuchi – producer
 Dream5  – Japanese vocals
 Melissa Hutchison – English vocals
 Alicyn Packard – English vocals
 Brent Pendergrass – English vocals
 Kenichiro Kimura – coordination
 Lucky Ikeda – music video producer, choreography

Track listing

Charts

Certifications

References 

2014 songs
2014 singles
Oricon Weekly number-one singles
J-pop songs
Anime songs
Yo-kai Watch